Welland—St. Catharines—Thorold was a federal electoral district represented in the House of Commons of Canada from 1988 to 1997. It was located in the province of Ontario. This riding was created in 1987 from Welland riding.

Welland—St. Catharines—Thorold consisted of the southern part of the City of St. Catharines, the City of Thorold and the northern part of the City of Welland.

The electoral district was abolished in 1996 when it was re-distributed between Niagara Centre, Niagara Falls and St. Catharines ridings.

Members of Parliament

This riding has elected the following Members of Parliament:

Election results

  
|Liberal
|Gilbert Parent
|align="right"|17,878
  
|Progressive Conservative
|Allan Pietz 
|align="right"|16,287 
 
|New Democratic
|Ken Lee
|align="right"|12,646 

  
|No affiliation
|Ron Walker 
|align="right"|71 
  
|Communist
|David Wallis
|align="right"|57

  
|Liberal
|Gilbert Parent
|align="right"|25,534
|53.97%
  
|Reform
|Don Johnstone
|align="right"| 11,901   
|25.15%
  
|Progressive Conservative
|Terry St. Amand
|align="right"| 5,472
|11.56%
 
|New Democratic
|Rob Dobrucki 
|align="right"|3,737
|7.89%
  
|Natural Law
|Laureen Amos 
|align="right"|311  
|0.66%

  
|Abolitionist
|Leonard Doucet
|align="right"|64 
|0.14%

See also 

 List of Canadian federal electoral districts
 Past Canadian electoral districts

External links 

 Website of the Parliament of Canada

Former federal electoral districts of Ontario
Politics of St. Catharines
Thorold
Welland